Shenks Ferry Site (36LA2) is a historic archaeological site located above Grubb Creek at Martic Township in Lancaster County, Pennsylvania. It underwent excavation in 1930-1931 and in 1973 by the Pennsylvania Historic and Museum Commission.  The excavations identified the presence of a village and seasonal campsites dated to the Late Woodland period.

It was listed on the National Register of Historic Places in 1982.

References 

Archaeological sites on the National Register of Historic Places in Pennsylvania
Archaeological sites in Lancaster County, Pennsylvania
National Register of Historic Places in Lancaster County, Pennsylvania